Robert Norman Buck (August 1, 1958 – December 19, 2000) was an American guitarist and founding member of the alternative rock band 10,000 Maniacs. Some of his compositions with Natalie Merchant are among the most popular songs recorded by 10,000 Maniacs, including "What's the Matter Here", "Hey Jack Kerouac", "You Happy Puppet" and "These Are Days".

Early life 
Buck was born August 1, 1958 in Jamestown, New York. He graduated from Cassadaga Valley High School in 1976 and received an associate's degree in anthropology from Jamestown Community College.

Career 
Buck decided to pursue a career as a professional guitarist after seeing The Jimi Hendrix Story. Buck, Dennis Drew, Steven Gustafson, John Lombardo, and Natalie Merchant formed 10,000 Maniacs in 1981; Buck was the band's lead guitarist.

The band's folk-rock music became popular with college students. Its 1987 album, In My Tribe, sold more than a million copies. In 1989, Blind Man's Zoo reached number 13 on the U.S. charts and was certified gold. Buck was the co-writer of some of the band's best-known songs, including "These Are Days", "Hey Jack Kerouac", and "What's the Matter Here?" He performed with the band at the Inaugural Ball in 1993. That same year, the band was profiled in Rolling Stone.

Buck was listed in Guitar Player magazine as one of the 100 greatest guitarists of all time.

Personal life and death 
Buck was married to Terri Newhouse from 1979 to 1981.

Buck was airlifted from the WCA Hospital in Jamestown to the University of Pittsburgh Medical Center Presbyterian Hospital on
November 30, 2000. He died of liver disease on December 19, 2000.

Discography 
With 10,000 Maniacs
Human Conflict Number Five (1982)
Secrets of the I Ching (1983)
The Wishing Chair (1985)
In My Tribe (1987)
Blind Man's Zoo (1989)
Hope Chest: The Fredonia Recordings 1982–1983 (1990)
Our Time in Eden (1992)
MTV Unplugged (1993)
Love Among the Ruins (1997)
The Earth Pressed Flat (1999)
Campfire Songs: The Popular, Obscure and Unknown Recordings (2004)

Other credits
Victory Gardens (1991) with John & Mary – lead guitar, mandolin
The Weedkiller's Daughter (1993) with John & Mary – lead guitar
The Pinwheel Galaxy (2003) with John & Mary – backwards guitar
Kerouac: Kicks Joy Darkness (2000)

References

External links 
10,000 Maniacs official site

1958 births
2000 deaths
10,000 Maniacs members
Alcohol-related deaths in Pennsylvania
American rock guitarists
American male guitarists
Songwriters from New York (state)
People from Jamestown, New York
American alternative rock musicians
Deaths from liver disease
Deaths from multiple organ failure
20th-century American musicians
Burials in Pennsylvania
Guitarists from New York (state)
20th-century American guitarists
20th-century American male musicians